Schweighouse-sur-Moder (literally Schweighouse on Moder) is a commune in the Bas-Rhin department in Grand Est in north-eastern France.

Prior to 8 September 1949, the commune was known as Schweighausen.

Twin towns
Schweighouse-sur-Moder is twinned with:

  Marano Lagunare, Italy

See also
Communes of the Bas-Rhin department

References

External links

Official site

Communes of Bas-Rhin
Bas-Rhin communes articles needing translation from French Wikipedia